Serge Le Dizet (born 27 June 1964 in Douarnenez, Finistère) is a French football coach who had a playing career. He is currently an assistant manager at Ligue 2 club Caen.

He played his whole career in Brittany, with Stade Quimperois, Stade Rennais FC and FC Nantes Atlantique.

He also managed US Concarneau.

References

1964 births
Living people
People from Douarnenez
French footballers
Ligue 1 players
Stade Rennais F.C. players
FC Nantes players
French football managers
FC Nantes managers
Quimper Kerfeunteun F.C. players
Ligue 1 managers
Association football defenders
Sportspeople from Finistère
Footballers from Brittany
Brittany international footballers